Charles F. Van de Water (October 12, 1872 – November 20, 1920) was a Republican politician in California. He was born in Hobart, New York.  He won a seat to the United States House of Representatives from California's 9th congressional district in the 1920 election by defeating the Prohibition party incumbent, Charles H. Randall.

Van de Water died in a car crash before assuming office, and Republican Walter F. Lineberger later won a special election to his seat.

See also
 List of members-elect of the United States House of Representatives who never took their seats

References

External links

1872 births
1920 deaths
20th-century American politicians
American people of Dutch descent
California Republicans
Elected officials who died without taking their seats
Road incident deaths in California
People from Hobart, New York